Grits & Gravy is an album by saxophonist Eric Kloss which was recorded in 1966 and released on the Prestige label.

Reception

AllMusic stated: "Eric Kloss' third recording features the soulful yet adventurous altoist in two different settings".

Track listing 
 "A Day in the Life of a Fool" (Luiz Bonfá, Carl Sigman) - 3:34  
 "Repeat" (Denny Zeitlin) - 3:11  
 "Slow Hot Wind" (Norman Gimbel, Henry Mancini) - 3:02  
 "Gentle One" (Eric Kloss) - 4:01  
 "Grits and Gravy" (Ed Bland) - 2:38  
 "Softly, As in a Morning Sunrise" (Oscar Hammerstein II, Sigmund Romberg) - 5:06  
 "You Don't Know What Love Is" (Gene de Paul, Don Raye) - 6:05  
 "Milestones" (Miles Davis) - 10:20  
Recorded at Van Gelder Studio in Englewood Cliffs, New Jersey on December 21 (tracks 1, 3 & 5) and December 22 (tracks 2, 4 & 6-8), 1966

Personnel 
Eric Kloss - alto saxophone
Danny Bank - soprano saxophone, flute, percussion (tracks 1, 3 & 5)
Teddy Charles - vibraphone (tracks 1, 3 & 5)
Jaki Byard (tracks 2, 4 & 6-8), Ronald Williams (tracks 1, 3 & 5) - piano 
Billy Butler - guitar (tracks 1, 3 & 5)
Ronnie Boykins (tracks 1, 3 & 5), Richard Davis (tracks 2, 4 & 6-8) - bass
Alan Dawson (tracks 2, 4 & 6-8), Robert J. Gregg (tracks 1, 3 & 5) - drums 
Ed Bland - arranger (tracks 1, 3 & 5)

References 

1967 albums
Eric Kloss albums
Prestige Records albums
Albums recorded at Van Gelder Studio
Albums produced by Cal Lampley